Hypercompe obtecta is a moth of the family Erebidae first described by Paul Dognin in 1907. It is found in Argentina.

References

Hypercompe
Moths described in 1907